The 2008 Liga Indonesia Premier Division Final was a football match which was played on 10 February 2008 at Si Jalak Harupat Stadium in Bandung. The match was supposed to take place on 9 February 2008 in Jakarta. However, due to fan riots in one of the semifinal matches, the match was postponed by a day and moved to Bandung to be played behind closed doors. Neither PSMS and Sriwijaya had made the final stage before. Sriwijaya won the match, defeating PSMS 3–1 in extra time, after the match was drawn at 1–1 at the conclusion of regular time.

Road to Bandung

Match details

See also
2007–08 Liga Indonesia Premier Division

References

External links
Liga Indonesia Premier Division standings

2007